Dede Dekaj (born 20 February 1970) is a former Albanian weightlifter who competed at the 1992 Summer Olympics, finishing 9th.

References

Weightlifters at the 1992 Summer Olympics
Olympic weightlifters of Albania
Living people
1970 births
Albanian male weightlifters
Place of birth missing (living people)
20th-century Albanian people